Milton M. Ticco (September 22, 1922 – January 26, 2002) was an American basketball and minor league baseball player.  An All-American basketball player at the University of Kentucky, he played two seasons in the United States' National Basketball League (NBL).

Ticco played for Adolph Rupp at Kentucky from 1940 to 1943.  Following a stint in the military during World War II, he played both professional basketball and baseball.  In the NBL (a precursor to today's National Basketball Association), Ticco played the 1946–47 NBL season with the Youngstown Bears and was named to the All-rookie second team.  In his NBL second season, Ticco split time with the Flint Dow A.C.'s and Indianapolis Kautskys, finishing the season with the Sheboygan Red Skins.  For his career, Ticco averaged 6 points per game in 60 contests.

Ticco played minor league baseball from 1946 to 1952 with the Cincinnati Reds and Brooklyn Dodgers organizations.

References

External links
College statistics at BigBlueHistory.net
Minor League baseball stats

1922 births
2002 deaths
All-American college men's basketball players
American men's basketball players
American military personnel of World War II
Asheville Tourists players
Baseball first basemen
Baseball players from Kentucky
Basketball players from Kentucky
Columbia Reds players
Flint Dow A.C.'s players
Forwards (basketball)
Guards (basketball)
Indianapolis Kautskys players
Kentucky Wildcats baseball players
Kentucky Wildcats men's basketball players
Lancaster Red Roses players
Miami Sun Sox players
People from Jenkins, Kentucky
Providence Chiefs players
Sheboygan Red Skins players
Sunbury Reds players
Syracuse Chiefs players
Youngstown Bears players